Henry Lester (1840–1926) was a British architect, merchant and philanthropist in Shanghai.

Birth and life in Britain
Lester was born in Southampton in 1840 as the youngest of four brothers. After finishing his university studies, he returned to Southampton with a bachelor's degree in architecture. Unluckily, all of his brothers died of an unknown disease. One doctor told him that he should leave his homeland, so Lester departed Southampton with sadness and disconsolation. Henry took a cargo ship to Shanghai with another Briton, Gordon Morris, who afterwards became his partner.

Early years in Shanghai
Lester arrived in Shanghai in 1867, and worked for the Shanghai Municipal Council for three years. Then he attended Shanghai Real Estate Agency, which was opened by the American businessman Edwin Smith, and he became a main shareholder of the agency. After Smith's retirement, Lester's own company, Lester, Johnson & Morris, took over all the assets of Shanghai Real Estate Agency and Lester became one of the richest merchants in Shanghai.

Mr. Lester and his company
According to the stipulation of Shanghai Municipal Council, staff members could not participate in its main business services and trade activities. Henry opened its own company, Lester. H, until the expiration of his contract. His compatriots Gordon Morris, George A. Johnson became shareholders together afterward. They renamed the company 'Lester, Johnson & Morris' and the Chinese name was kept as before. It became one of the most well-known architect offices. It is hard to know how many architectures did this office design and construct.

Main architectures
Sincere Department Store, Shanghai Branch (No.646, East Nanjing Road) 1917
Nissin Building (No. 5, the Bund) 1921
Puyi Building (No.110, Middle Sichuan Road) 1922
North China Daily News Building (No.17, the Bund) 1924
Bank of Taiwan Building (No. 16, the Bund) 1926
Renji Hospital (No.145, Shandong Road) 1932
Henry Lester Institute of Technical Education (No.505, Changzhi Road) 1934
Mitsubishi Bank Building (No.85, Guangdong Road) 1936
Jialing Office Building (No.346, Middle Sichuan Road) 1937

Most of them are historic architectures in Shanghai.

Heritage
Mr. Henry Lester bequeathed most of his assets to establish and endow the Henry Lester Trust Limited, which support Chinese Students study in UK.

External links
 Introduction of Henry Lester Trust Ltd

References

1840 births
1926 deaths
Architects from Hampshire
British philanthropists
People from Southampton
British expatriates in China